NCAT is an acronym for:

National Center for Appropriate Technology, an American organisation dedicated to technology and sustainability
National Center for Aviation Training, Wichita Area Technical College
New South Wales Civil and Administrative Tribunal, an agency of the Government of New South Wales
North Carolina A&T State University, a historically black university in Greensboro, North Carolina.
 National Center for Asphalt Technology at Auburn University in Auburn, AL 86830